Stradella may refer to:

Places in Italy
Municipalities (comuni)
Stradella, Lombardy, in the Province of Pavia

Civil parishes (frazioni)
Stradella (Bigarello), in the commune of Bigarello, Province of Mantua, Lombardy
Stradella (Collecchio), in the commune of Collecchio, Province of Parma, Emilia-Romagna
Stradella (Gambolò), in the commune of Gambolò, Province of Pavia, Lombardy
Stradella (Refrancore), in the commune of Refrancore, Province of Asti, Piedmont
Stradella (San Polo d'Enza), in the commune of San Polo d'Enza, Province of Reggio Emilia, Emilia-Romagna

People
Alessandro Stradella (1639-1682), Italian composer

Other uses
Stradella (Niedermeyer), an 1837 opera by Louis Niedermeyer
Stradella (Franck), an 1841 opera by César Franck
Alessandro Stradella (opera), an 1844 opera by Friedrich von Flotow
Stradella bass system, a keyboard system used on the bass side of many accordions